This is the discography for American 
rock and blues band Canned Heat.

Studio albums

Collaborative albums

Live albums

Compilation albums

Singles

Notes

References

External links
 
 Entries at 45cat.com

Blues discographies
Discographies of American artists
Rock music group discographies